Na Yeong-seok (born April 15, 1976), often known by his nickname Na PD, is a South Korean television producer and director. Na is best known for producing the popular variety-reality shows 2 Days & 1 Night,  New Journey to the West, Grandpas Over Flowers, Three Meals a Day, Youn's Kitchen, Youn's Stay and their spin-offs.

Career

2 Days & 1 Night

Na Yeong-seok majored in Public Administration at Yonsei University. In 2001, he joined KBS and began his career as an assistant director in the network's variety department, then was promoted to producer/director.

Na made his breakthrough in 2007 with 1 Night 2 Days, which introduced the road trip format to Korean reality programming, as a regular cast of comedians, singers and actors visit various towns across Korea and spend the eponymous one night and two days there, engaging in activities such as games, camping and sightseeing. Starring Kang Ho-dong, Lee Soo-geun, Eun Ji-won, Kim Jong-min, Noh Hong-chul, and Ji Sang-ryeol (Kim C, Lee Seung-gi, MC Mong, and Uhm Tae-woong later joined the cast),  1 Night 2 Days quickly became the highest rated variety program on KBS and a national viewing pastime, reaching a peak viewership rating of 40%. The show not only boosted tourism for the locations it featured, its massive popularity also extended to its cast and even the crew. Because Na often appeared onscreen during interactions with the cast, he himself soon became a household name among Korean audiences, who affectionately called him "Na PD" ("PD" is a commonly used term in Korean television that denotes "producer-director" or "production director").

He also developed another KBS program in 2012, The Human Condition, in which six comedians (Kim Jun-hyun, Kim Joon-ho, Heo Kyung-hwan, Yang Sang-guk, Jung Tae-ho and Park Seong-ho) live together for seven days under certain restrictions, such as without gadgets, electricity, or water. Na produced the four-episode pilot. 

Na resigned from KBS on December 18, 2012, after working for the broadcaster for 12 years. His departure and that of other cast members marked the end of the first season of  1 Night 2 Days (episodes 1–232); the second season was launched with a new crew and additional new cast members. The Human Condition also continued airing without Na's involvement.

Grandpas Over Flowers
On January 2, 2013, Na signed with media conglomerate CJ E&M, which owns cable channels such as tvN. CJ E&M had reportedly wooed him with not just a bigger salary, but the assurance of greater creative control and clout. Na said, "I determined that there is more room for creativity (in cable). Things move at a fast pace. The programs come and go as does the attention of viewers. So we are forced to try different things."

For his first cable program, Na again chose the concept of travel, but this time overseas. In an increasingly youth-obsessed medium and culture, he surprised pundits by casting four actors in their seventies: Lee Soon-jae, Shin Goo, Park Geun-hyung and Baek Il-seob. Since backpacking was mostly associated with the young, Na wanted to flip the idea and make it fresh. He said that by placing veteran actors (who are fixed in their habits) in exotic settings, it allowed for "unexpected" elements to unfold that made for great TV. Titled Grandpas Over Flowers (a pun on the Japanese manga Boys Over Flowers), the show filmed the four actors traveling to France and Switzerland while accompanied by their "porter", 40-something actor Lee Seo-jin. It was immediately a ratings hit when it aired in 2013, and like 2 Days & 1 Night before it, became a cultural phenomenon. The cast drew increased mainstream popularity among the younger generation, and the show sparked a trend of senior citizen-themed shows among rival networks. tvN also leveraged the show's domestic popularity into international success, selling remake rights to China and the United States. When asked why the show struck a chord with audiences, Na said, "It's because older people with a lot of experience, have lots of stories to tell. When you travel with people with a lot of experience who have gone through the success and failures in life, you learn a lot from them."

With the success of Grandpas Over Flowers following 2 Days & 1 Night, Na cemented his reputation as the most influential creator and producer in Korean reality television.

The next seasons were filmed in Taiwan (2013), Spain (2014), and Greece (2015). Actress Choi Ji-woo joined the cast for the Greece trip.

Sisters Over Flowers, Youth Over Flowers
While Grandpas Over Flowers went on hiatus in late 2013 (the cast was busy with their respective acting projects), Na produced the first spin-off, Sisters Over Flowers. Using the same format, he cast a group of top actresses (Youn Yuh-jung, Kim Ja-ok, Kim Hee-ae and Lee Mi-yeon) and pushed them out of their comfort zone as they traveled to Croatia. The show also reunited Na with 2 Days & 1 Night alum Lee Seung-gi, who acted as this season's "porter".

The second spin-off, which aired in 2014 after the Spain season of Grandpas Over Flowers, was Youth Over Flowers. It featured singer-songwriters Yoon Sang, You Hee-yeol and Lee Juck in Peru, and Reply 1994 actors Yoo Yeon-seok, Son Ho-jun and Baro in Laos. Na only directed the Peru segments, while Reply 1994 director Shin Won-ho filmed in Laos. Both spin-offs likewise drew high ratings for cable. The series later spawned three more seasons; which were filmed in Iceland, Africa (featuring the cast of Reply 1988) and Australia (featuring boy band Winner).

Na also made cameo appearances on two tvN scripted series. As a meta in-joke about his real-life alma mater, he played a boarder from Yonsei University in episode 2 of the nostalgic campus drama Reply 1994. Reply 1994'''s director Shin Won-ho and screenwriter Lee Woo-jung had previously worked with Na on 2 Days & 1 Night. Then as a favor to Lee Soon-jae, Na played a police officer in episode 66 of Lee's sitcom Potato Star 2013QR3.

Three Meals a Day
After Youth Over Flowers, Na wanted to continue to innovate. Inspired by Lee Seo-jin's complaints that he hated cooking while preparing meals in Grandpas Over Flowers, Na cast Lee opposite his Wonderful Days co-star Ok Taecyeon in Three Meals a Day. The two men were tasked to cook three meals a day from home-grown ingredients while living three days a week in a rural village in Jeongseon County, Gangwon Province. Though the concept seemed simple, Lee and Ok, both city dwellers, had difficulty cultivating the vegetable garden and harvesting from the farm animals and the sorghum field, such that they struggled to feed themselves (and weekly celebrity guests) to comical results. Na said, "All cooking shows do not have to feature fancy, delicious food. We seek the sincerity that comes from cooking with all their hearts. I just wanted to work on a lighthearted show that can highlight the small pleasures of life. I wanted to talk about a meal that is made with vegetables from my garden and have these two guys share their homely foods with their friends. The main concept is that it is a cooking show but with no mouth-watering foods because these two guys can't cook."

For the second season in 2015, Na added a third cast member, Kim Kwang-kyu. The show's difficulty level was increased with an additional four-month project depicting the process of growing food, from cultivation to harvest (the cast was strictly prohibited from grocery shopping). Na said, "Nature itself is incredible. I wanted to show the audience how hard it is to harvest the materials for our daily meals that can now be easily purchased at supermarkets near our homes."

Three Meals a Day: Fishing Village
In 2015, Na produced the spin-off Three Meals a Day: Fishing Village, set on the remote island of Manjae, which takes six hours to reach by ferry from the mainland. Besides the isolated location, the seaside setting meant more intensive physical labor for cast members Cha Seung-won, Yoo Hae-jin, and Son Ho-jun (Son replaced Jang Keun-suk when Jang was edited out of the show after a tax evasion controversy). Viewers were impressed with Cha's cooking skills amidst minimal ingredients and implements (hence his nickname "Chajumma"), and the show received a record-high 14.2% rating. Season 1 had a winter setting, while the second season was filmed in the summer. For the show's third season, Na added a new member, Nam Joo-hyuk. The location was switched from a fishing village to Gochang, where the members take on rice-farming for the first time. 
The show resumed its "fishing village" concept in the next season, which was filmed in Deukryang island. It stars an entirely new cast which includes a returning Lee Seo-jin alongside Yoon Kyun-sang and Eric Mun from Shinhwa. Viewers were impressed by Eric Mun, who showed unexpected cooking skills and fishing expertise.

Na later said that his rural upbringing in Cheongju, North Chungcheong Province influenced his work ("I'm the perfect opposite of trendy and sophisticated"), and that he specializes in reality shows because he "can take a story from anyone" by editing footage given to him by cameramen and making any story out of it. He said, "Everyone has their own personality and their view on life, which naturally creates stories when they are put together with other people. [...] The viewer ratings can always decline. I don't want to make a fancy reality show where I just think about the ratings. I want to keep my tone when I make a reality show."

Three Meals a Day: Sea Ranch
The show's seventh season, was filmed in Deungnyangdo, a remote island near the sea. Unlike its previous concept where members had to grow and cook their own food, the show featured a more laid-back concept where members were tasked to deliver fresh milk from mountain goats to the people on the island.

New Journey to the West
Na then reunited with his former 2 Days & 1 Night stars Lee Seung-gi, Kang Ho-dong, Eun Ji-won and Lee Soo-geun, as the quartet took on characters from the 16th century classic Chinese novel Journey to the West and traveled for five days through Xi'an, once the capital of China during the Tang Dynasty. New Journey to the West was the first project of tvN Go (the cable channel's digital content brand), and it was unprecedented for a variety show to be distributed solely through online streaming (on the web portals Naver TV Cast and QQ). Instead of the usual one-hour episode length, each uploaded video clip lasted from five to ten minutes, and the Internet provided freedom from broadcast television's restrictions, such as a ban on indirect advertising of certain brands and adult language (including references to the tax evasion and illegal gambling controversies Kang and Lee, respectively, had been involved in). The show was a success with over 42 million views on Naver TV Cast and 10 million views on Chinese portal site QQ.

The second season of the show was filmed in Chengdu, which included a new cast member Ahn Jae-hyun (replacing Lee Seung Gi who left for military conscription). Aside from airing on online platforms, the show was now aired on cable channel tvN. It garnered over 100 million views in China. The third season of the show, added boy band members Kyuhyun and Song Min-ho and was filmed in Guilin. The fourth season of the show was filmed in Vietnam. The fifth season was filmed in Hong Kong with a new member P.O (Pyo Ji-hoon Block B). Then, it is continuously aired the sixth season that was filmed in Hokkaido. Ahn Jae-hyun was not shown in the seventh season due to his personal family issue, this season was all filmed in South Korea

Youn's Kitchen
In 2017, Na decided to introduce a new program which focuses on a group of South Korean celebrities (Youn Yuh-jung, Lee Seo-jin, Park Seo-joon and Jung Yu-mi) operating a small Korean cuisine restaurant on a small island overseas. Season 1 was filmed in Indonesia; while Season 2 was filmed in Spain. Na said that the show aims to fulfill people's fantasy of running a mom-and-pop restaurant in a foreign country. 
The series was a huge success, with its second season garnering 16% ratings, a record high for an entertainment show on a cable channel. It also helped spread a social trend among young Koreans of trying to break away from a lifestyle devoted to work and money and embracing the motto YOLO ("You Only Live Once").

Kang's Kitchen
Kang's Kitchen is a spin-off of Na's other program New Journey to the West, which features the cast running a pork cutlet restaurant on Jeju Island.

Trivia
Also known as the dictionary of useless knowledge, is a show that's already in its third season, airing on TVN, official site.

Little Cabin in the Woods
After the success of Youn's Kitchen, Na was allowed to create a program of his own choice. Na thus decided to create a documentary-formatted program which follows two celebrities' (So Ji-sub and Park Shin-hye) off-grid lives in a house in the middle of the woods in Jeju Island; out of reach of technology and people. There, the cast members are required to fill their day by completing missions and doing such basic chores as cooking, making a fire and chopping firewood. Na explained that he created the show to show busy people in the cities that there is a slow-paced and more leisurely way of life. In line with his philosophy of creating his previous programs, Little Cabin in the Woods was created on the premise that TV viewers take great comfort by watching celebrities living slow-paced, peaceful lives.

Youn's Stay

Youn's Stay is Youn's third series, an entertainment program in which Korean celebrities (Youn Yuh-jung, Lee Seo-jin, Jung Yu-mi, Park Seo-joon, and Choi Woo-shik) run accommodations in Gurye-gun, Jeollanam-do, Korea.

Earth Arcade

Earth Arcade is producer Na Young-seok's new travel variety show that aired in 2022. The first season took place in Thailand, with the first shooting in Bangkok, the second shooting in Ko Samui Island, and the third shooting in Khlong Sok National Park. Korean celebrities (Lee Eun-ji, Mimi, Lee Young-ji, and An Yu-jin) appeared, and both the program and the cast gained high popularity.

 Philanthropy 
In January 2023, Na became the first donor in Chungcheongbuk-do to donate 5 million won, the highest donation amount since the Love Homeland Donation System was implemented.

 Filmography 
Ref:

 As assistant director 

 As producer-director 

 Acting cameos 

 Web shows 

 Books PD, Who & How (2005; co-author)Anyway, the Race Is Long''  (2012)

Awards

State honors

Notes

References

External links 

Living people
1976 births
People from Cheongju
South Korean television producers
South Korean television directors
South Korean television personalities
Yonsei University alumni